The yanggeum is a traditional Korean string instrument.  It is a hammered dulcimer. Unlike other traditional Korean instruments (most of which have silk strings), the yanggeum has metal strings.  It is played by striking the strings with a bamboo stick.
Yanggeum means a stringed instrument of the West (yang). The yanggeum is also called seoyanggeum ("Western stringed instrument") or gura cheolsageum (歐邏鐵絲琴,"European metal stringed instrument"). The origin of the yanggeum is based on a South asian instrument called the santoor. The Chinese introduced it into Korea in the 18th century. Its body is flat and trapezoidal, with seven sets of four metal strings. The right hand strikes the strings with a thin bamboo strip.

See also 
 Yangqin
 Hammered dulcimer
 Santur
 Santoor

References

Korean musical instruments
Hammered box zithers